DYCS-TV (channel 47) is a television station in Metro Cebu, Philippines, serving as the flagship of the catholic channel CCTN. Owned and operated by the Roman Catholic Archdiocese of Cebu through its licensee Radio Veritas Global Broadcasting, Inc., the station maintains studios at the CCTN Broadcast Center, Cardinal Rosales Ave., Cebu Business Park, Cebu City, and its transmitting facility is located atop Busay Hills.

CCTN airs mostly Catholic programs, as well as locally produced Cebuano language telenovelas, news and public service.

Website 
CCTN's official website

Television stations in Cebu City
Television channels and stations established in 2002
2002 establishments in the Philippines